Western Iran consists of Armenian Highlands, Northern Zagros and the rich agricultural area of the Khuzestan Plain in the south.

It includes the provinces of Kordestan, Kermanshah, Ilam, Lorestan, and Hamadan. Some references also count West Azerbaijan Province and Khuzestan Province to this region.

The major cities are Sanandaj, Kermanshah, Ilam, Khorramabad,  Hamadan, sometimes Urmia and Ahvaz.

Climate
Humid continental climate in the north.
Hot-summer Mediterranean climate in the north.
cold semi-arid climate in the Zagros mountains.
Warm summer continental climate all over the central mountain ranges.
Hot desert climate in Khuzestan.

See also
 Northern Iran
 Southern Iran
 Eastern Iran
 Central Iran
 Northwestern Iran

References 
 

Subdivisions of Iran